Kakrala Bhaika is a large village located in the Patiala district of the Indian state of Punjab. The population was 7165 as of the 2011 census. Kakrala Bhaika is 110 km from Chandigarh and 37 km from Patiala. Bhaika is known for Kabbadi.

Education 
The schools are DAV Public sr. sec., St. Lawrence English School, Public Girls School & No Coolege, Petrol Pumps, and the main Mandi (Anaj Mandi). 4 Gurudwaras and Temples of Shiv Ji, Hanuman, and Lakshmi Devi & Vishavkarma

References

Villages in Patiala district